Hector Tyndale (a.k.a. George Hector Tyndale) was a Union general during the American Civil War rising to the rank of Brevet Major General of Volunteers. He notably led brigades at the battles of Antietam and Wauhatchie. Apart from the war Tyndale was an expert in porcelain and pottery.

Biography

Early life 
Tyndale's father was a prominent Philadelphia businessman who engaged in the importation of china and glassware. Hector Tyndale eventually followed his father's footsteps and ran the family business in partnership with his brother-in-law. Tyndale made several trips to personally inspect European factories thus becoming very familiar with the whole art of pottery and porcelain making. His personal collection became one of the finest in the whole country.

His brother was Sharon Tyndale who served as Illinois Secretary of State.

Tyndale became involved in Republican politics in Philadelphia around 1856. Although a Republican he was not an abolitionist and therefore had no sympathy for the fate of John Brown and his raiders. Despite this Tyndale agreed to escort the widow of John Brown to pay a last visit to her husband and recover his body after execution. It was believed Mrs. Brown's life was in danger because of her husband's recent actions. Brown's body was delivered to Tyndale who insisted on its identification before accepting it on Mrs. Brown's behalf.

Civil War 
Tyndale was on another inspection trip to Europe when the Civil War began. He returned to the U.S. and volunteered for the Union Army. He was appointed major in the 28th Pennsylvania Volunteer Infantry on June 28, 1861. His regiment was sent to garrison duty at Harpers Ferry. On April 25, 1862, he was promoted to lieutenant colonel of his regiment and fought at the Second Battle of Bull Run. On September 17, 1862, Tyndale, still only a lieutenant colonel, found himself as the senior officer in his brigade. Therefore, he assumed command of the 1st Brigade, 2nd Division, XII Corps during the Battle of Antietam. Tyndale led his brigade as part of George S. Greene's attack against the Dunker Church. Early in the fighting he was wounded in the hip but continued in command until wounded a second time in the head. He left the field to recover and would not return to command until late July 1863. While recovering he was promoted two grades to that of brigadier general to date from November 29, 1862, for his conspicuous service at Antietam.

Tyndale returned to command his brigade in the aftermath of the Battle of Gettysburg. Later that Fall, Joseph Hooker was assigned to lead reinforcements to the beleaguered Union Army at Chattanooga. Hooker took with him the XI and XII Corps to which Tyndale's brigade was part of. Tyndale led his brigade at the Battle of Wauhatchie, leading a bayonet charge and turning the enemy's flank. He also took part, albeit in a minor role, in the battle of Chattanooga. On August 26, 1864, Tyndale resigned from the army due to poor health. He was brevetted to major general on March 13, 1865.

Command History
 1st Brigade, 2nd Division, XII Corps (17 Sept 1862)
 1st Brigade, 3rd Division, XI Corps (13 July – 19 Sept 1863)
 1st Brigade, 3rd Division, XI Corps (12 Oct 1863 – 15 Feb 1865)
 3rd Division, XI Corps (15 Feb – 16 Apr 1864)
 3rd Brigade, 1st Division, XX Corps (16 Apr – 3 May 1864)

Later life 
After his career in the army, Tyndale returned to his business in Philadelphia. He unsuccessfully ran for mayor in 1868. A relative, Professor John Tyndall of England, lectured in the U.S. and devoted the proceeds to fund for the promotion of science education and named General Tyndale as one of the trustees. Eventually the fund became a scholarship and at the University of Pennsylvania the scholarship was known as the Hector Tyndale scholarship for physics. In 1869, he was elected as a member to the American Philosophical Society.

In 1876 Tyndale's prominence in the porcelain business caused his selection as one of the judges for the Centennial Exhibition.

General Tyndale died in Philadelphia in 1880. He is buried at Laurel Hill Cemetery.

References 

Military personnel from Philadelphia
People of Pennsylvania in the American Civil War
John Brown (abolitionist)
Businesspeople from Philadelphia
Pennsylvania Republicans
Union Army generals
1821 births
1880 deaths